Suroboyo Bridge or commonly known as Kenjeran Bridge is a through arch bridge across the coastal area of Eastern Surabaya in Kenjeran Beach, District Kenjeran, Surabaya, East Java, Indonesia. This bridge has a length of 800 meters with a width of 18 meters and a height of 12 meters which is held with 150 stakes.  The design of the bridge is built in a circle with a view of the fountain in the center of bridge.

History

Construction 
The construction of the bridge began in January 2015 and was built by PT Hutama Karya, an Indonesian state-owned construction company. The bridge was built from the Kenjeran Beach Amusement Park (THP), part of Eastern Surabaya Outer Ring-road project, across to the Bulak Fisheries Center (SIB) area and fishing settlements in Nambangan, Kedung Cowek.

Opening 
The bridge was inaugurated on 9 July 2016, which was marked by the release of hundreds of fireworks and lanterns by the Mayor of Surabaya after pressing the button to sign the inauguration of the Suroboyo Bridge.

Critics 
The bridge project was criticized by members of the Surabaya city council because it was assessed without good planning. An economic lecturer from Airlangga University, Nisful Laila, believes that the Kenjeran bridge is inefficient. Sepuluh Nopember Institute of Technology's urban planning expert Putu Rudy Setiawan added that the construction of the Kenjeran Bridge was lacking in planning. At the time, the Head of the Public Works and Public Works Office of the Surabaya City Highways and Eradication Office, Erna Purnawati, denied various arguments that the Kenjeran Bridge was built to advance the tourism sector in Surabaya.

See also 

 Arch bridge
 Through arch bridge
 List of bridges

References

External links 

 About Suroboyo Bridge

Bridges completed in 2016
Buildings and structures in Surabaya
Transport in East Java
Through arch bridges in Indonesia
Arch bridges in Indonesia